Frankston Hospital (officially Frankston Public Hospital) is a 454-bed public hospital located in the Melbourne suburb of Frankston in Victoria, Australia. It opened as the Frankston Community Hospital on 30 November 1941.

It is the largest provider of general and speciality health care for Melbourne's Mornington Peninsula, and is the region's chief provider of acute secondary and tertiary medical and surgical services.

The hospital has specialisations in mental health, maternity (midwifery) and pediatrics. It also has one of the busiest emergency departments in Victoria with 49 beds and around 63,000 presentations a year. The department was upgraded in 2015 at a cost of A$81 million.

It is one of two hospitals in the Peninsula Health network, the second being Rosebud Hospital, which together support the network's smaller specialist campuses for community health, dentistry, physical and psychiatric rehabilitation, aged (elderly) and palliative care in Frankston, Hastings, Mornington, Mount Eliza and Rosebud.

Services

Frankston Hospital provides general and speciality health care services in the following areas:

Allied Health
 Nutrition and Dietetic Services
 Occupational Therapy
 Physiotherapy
 Integrating Care
 Speech Pathology Services
Cancer Services
 Breast Cancer Support Service
 Oncology Day Unit
 Radiotherapy Services

Cardiac Services
 Cardiac Angiography
 Cardiology Department
 Chronic Heart Failure Program
 Coronary Care Unit

Emergency Medicine
 Frankston Emergency Department
 Medical Assessment and Planning Unit (MAPU)
 Response, Assessment and Discharge (RAD) Unit

Home-based Services
 Hospital in the Home
 Midwifery Home Care Service
 Peninsula Post Acute Care (PENPAC)

Intensive Care Unit

Medical Services
 Dermatology
 Diabetes & Endocrinology
 Gastroenterology
 General Medicine
 Haematology
 Infectious Diseases
 Medical Wards
 Neurology
 Renal Medicine and Haemodialysis
 Respiratory Services
 Rheumatology
 Stroke Unit

Neuropsychology and Psychiatric Service

Outpatient Service

Palliative Care Services

Peninsula Amputee Program

Social Work Services

Surgical Services
 Anaesthetics
 Day Surgery Unit
 General Surgery
 Operating Theatres
 Short Stay Unit
 Surgical Wards

Women's, Children's and Adolescent Health
 Children's and Adolescent Health
 Midwifery Inpatient Services
 Peninsula Health Maternity Services
 Special Care Nursery
 Women's Services

References

External links
 

Hospital buildings completed in 1941
Hospitals in Melbourne
Teaching hospitals in Australia
Hospitals established in 1941
1941 establishments in Australia
Frankston, Victoria
Buildings and structures in the City of Frankston